{{DISPLAYTITLE:C3H6N2}}
The molecular formula C3H6N2 (molar mass: 70.09 g/mol, exact mass: 70.0531 u) may refer to:

 Aminopropionitrile (BAPN)
 Dihydroimidazol-2-ylidene
 Imidazolines
2-Imidazoline
 Pyrazoline